The 2015–16 Mittelrheinliga was the 60th season of the Mittelrheinliga, one of three state association league systems in the state of North Rhine-Westphalia, covering its southwestern part. It was the fourth season of the league as a fifth level of the German football league system.

League table 
The league featured five new clubs for the 2015–16 season with SpVg Wesseling-Urfeld, SV Breinig, Blau-Weiß Friesdorf and TV Herkenrath promoted from the Landesliga Mittelrhein while FC Hennef 05 had been relegated from the Regionalliga West.

Top goalscorers 
The top goal scorers:

References

External links 
 

2015–16 Oberliga
2015-16